Campbell Bay may refer to:

 Campbell Bay (Great Nicobar)
 Campbell Bay (Nunavut), Canada